The Singapore People's Party (abbreviation: SPP) is an opposition  political party in Singapore.

History
SPP was founded on 21 November 1994 by Sin Kek Tong, who led a pro-Chiam See Tong faction out of the Singapore Democratic Party (SDP). Over two years, Sin stood as the pro-tem leader until Chiam joined the party and assumed leadership in December 1996, at the time the Parliament was dissolved ahead of the 1997 general election. Chiam then became the party's first Member of Parliament (MP) when he won the constituency of Potong Pasir at the election, where he also did under the SDP banner.

Membership of the Singapore Democratic Alliance
In 2001, the SPP became a founding member of the Singapore Democratic Alliance (SDA), along with the National Solidarity Party (NSP), the Singapore Justice Party (SJP) and the Singapore Malay National Organisation (PKMS). Chiam became the founding Chairman of SDA, which aimed to provide a common grouping under which different opposition parties could stand as a political coalition in elections against the ruling People's Action Party (PAP).

At the 2001 general election, Chiam See Tong was returned to Parliament as MP for Potong Pasir. Though Chiam was the only SDA member to win an elected seat in Parliament, he was joined in Parliament by SDA member Steve Chia (then-leader of the National Solidarity Party) who became a non-constituency MP after securing 34.6% of the votes in the constituency of Chua Chu Kang, which was the highest percentage of the vote secured by a losing opposition candidate at the election. The result made Chiam the de facto leader of the opposition in Parliament, as the SDA had two representatives (Chiam and Chia), whereas the only other opposition party represented in Parliament (the Workers' Party) had only one (Hougang MP Low Thia Khiang).

At the 2006 general election, Chiam See Tong was again re-elected as MP for Potong Pasir. However, the SDA did not win any other seats. Steve Chia lost his position as a non-constituency MP. Though Chia increased his share of the vote in Chua Chu Kang to 39.63%, this was lower than the 43.9% gained by the Workers' Party in Aljunied GRC. The role of de facto leader of the opposition in Parliament therefore passed from Chiam to the Workers' Party leader Low.

Withdrawal from the Singapore Democratic Alliance
The NSP withdrew from the SDA in 2007, but the SPP remained in the alliance with the SJP and PKMS.

In 2010, Chiam tried to bring the Reform Party into the SDA. He reportedly accepted the conditions the RRP set out for joining the alliance, but the terms of entry were opposed by other members of the Central Executive Committee (CEC) who blocked the move. Chiam also suffered a mild stroke in 2008, following which he had to cut back on some of his political activities. This led some CEC members to question whether he was able to properly fulfill his role of Chairman of the alliance.

On 28 February 2011, the CEC voted to relieve Chiam of his role as chairman, however, the CEC stressed that they still hoped to field Chiam as a candidate at the next general election. Chiam had earlier announced his intention to stand in a Group Representation Constituency while leaving the Potong Pasir Single Member Constituency to a successor at the next general election. Two days later, Chiam announced that the party would be withdrawing from the SDA and that he would stand under the banner of the SPP instead of the SDA at the next general election. Due to the withdrawal, Chiam's chairman role was succeeded to Desmond Lim, the leader of SJP.

At the elections, Chiam announced that he led his team to contest the Bishan-Toa Payoh Group Representation Constituency, leaving his Potong Pasir ward to his wife, Lina Loh Woon Lee (Lina Chiam). This was Loh's debut in politics, although she had tirelessly campaigned with her husband over the years in many general elections in Singapore, including Cairnhill and Potong Pasir constituencies. Chairman Sin was also fielded to contest the newly-formed Hong Kah North SMC, a ward which was formerly part of the Hong Kah GRC (now Chua Chu Kang GRC).

After the polling day, the party was defeated in all the constituencies contested, including Potong Pasir which was reclaimed by the PAP for the first time since 1984; consequently, Chiam's defeat ended his 27-year tenure in Parliament. However, Loh was offered a post for the Non-Constituency Member of Parliament (NCMP) as a result of being the best performing opposition candidate (amongst unelected candidates) after narrowly losing the election 49.64% to the PAP's Sitoh Yih Pin's 50.36% (a margin of 114 votes).

In overall terms, the SPP managed to clinch 41.42% (62,504 votes) of the total number of votes in the constituencies that it contested.

2015 General Elections
Ahead of the 2015 elections (due to be held 11 September), Chiam announced that he would not stand as a candidate for the elections, for the first time since his debut in 1976. Another opposition party, the Democratic Progressive Party, who led by Benjamin Pwee and Hamin Aliyas, joined SPP to strengthen its team contesting Bishan–Toa Payoh GRC. New candidate Ravi Philemon replaced Chairman Sin as candidate for Hong Kah North, while Lina Chiam contested again in Potong Pasir. Former NSP member Jeannette Chong-Aruldoss joined the party prior, and contested Mountbatten SMC just as Chong did in the 2011 elections.

However, the absence of Chiam in the election saw their party suffered another major setback, not only did the party fail to win a parliamentary seat, their scores were overseen by large swings towards the PAP, one of which was Potong Pasir, where Lina Chiam managed to secure only 33.59% of the valid votes, down from 49.64%. Comparing to the Workers' Party's performances (of East Coast GRC, Fengshan SMC and Punggol East SMC), this was not enough for Chiam to secure her NCMP seat for a second term, thus ending their party presence in Parliament since the party foundation. In terms of the party's overall vote, they garnered only 27.08% of the votes cast, a swing of -14.34% from the previous election.

On 1 March 2017, the party reported that former party's chairman Sin died from prostate cancer two days ago.

In January 2018, it was reported that Jose Raymond, a former Press Secretary to Vivian Balakrishnan (who also served as Chief Executive of the Singapore Environment Council and current Minister of Foreign Affairs), had joined the SPP. Also in the same year, WP's Low Thia Khiang surpassed Chiam as the longest-serving opposition MP, having served in Parliament since 1991.

Leadership Transition and 2020 elections
On 4 September 2019, Chiam announced that he would step down from the secretary-general post due to declining health and Lina Chiam would step down from the chairman post, while the party's Facebook page posted that they would electing a new leader by 16 October on a biennial Ordinary Party Conference, among which Jeannette Chong-Aruldoss would be stepping down from the party's Central Executive Committee (CEC). Chiam stepped down on 16 October 2019, with four new faces elected into the Central Executive Committee. On 5 November 2019, Steve Chia was elected as the new Secretary-General of the Singapore People's Party, along with Jose Raymond as Chairman.

On the election day on 10 July, the party failed to make headways for the third consecutive election as the party lost to the PAP on both of the two constituencies they contested (Bishan-Toa Payoh GRC and Potong Pasir SMC) despite seeing a small anti-PAP vote swing. Their party improved their party's overall vote to 33.83%, but their overall popular vote fell to 1.52%.

On 22 December 2020, SPP Chairman Jose Raymond announced that he was retiring from politics, while revealing that the Assistant Secretary-General, Ariffin Sha, resigned from the party in August. Vice-Chairman Williiamson Lee became Acting Chairman, while Ariffin's position was not filled. The SPP CEC accepted the resignations on 17 January 2021 and co-opted Khan Osman Sulaiman and Melvyn Chiu.

Leadership

Former elected Members of Parliament

Electoral history

Parliamentary elections
Due to a merger with the Singapore Democratic Alliance in the 2001 and 2006 elections, the number of candidates represented by the Singapore People's Party was displayed in parenthesis; the number of elected seats represented shown first was for the Singapore People's Party, and the next by SDA.

References

External links
 
Singapore People's Party (SPP) party symbol, explained by SADeafSG
ChannelNewsAsia 1 May 2011 on SPP candidate for Potong Pasir in GE 2011

Political parties in Singapore
Social liberal parties
Singapore
1994 establishments in Singapore
Political parties established in 1994